The North Saskatchewan River flood of 1915 was one of the largest floods in the history of Edmonton. On 28 June, the Edmonton Bulletin reported the river had risen "10 feet in as many hours." A frantic telegram from Rocky Mountain House alerted local authorities to the flood's arrival. 

The water rose to the deck level of the Low Level Bridge and debris was gathered along the bridge. The debris included a house swept away by the current. The Canadian Northern Railway parked a train on the bridge to hold the bridge down and try to prevent it from being swept away.. 

Thousands of Edmonton residents watched the flood destroy lumber mills along the city's river valley.

Like all rivers, the North Saskatchewan River is subject to periodic flooding, beginning with rapid snowmelt in the mountains or prolonged periods of rain in the river basin. With the establishment of permanent communities along the river's course, and the rise of an administrative/government structure, records exist recording floods in the North Saskatchewan for the past century. The river is known to have flooded in 1830 but the 1899 flooding of the river was the first summer-time flood of the river in known human experience or local folklore. The 1915 flood peaked at about 4 metres higher than the 1899 flood. The Bighorn Dam, constructed in the early 1970s near Nordegg, Alberta, and the Brazeau Reservoir, constructed in the mid-1960s, have not reduced potential for flooding on the North Saskatchewan River.

Notes

References

External links
City of Edmonton - The Flood of 1915
Look Out Edmonton short documentary

Floods in Canada
1915 in Alberta
1915 in Saskatchewan
History of Edmonton
Natural disasters in Alberta

1915 disasters in Canada